Susan Estelle Jansen Corbett is an American television producer and writer.

Her credits include Home Improvement, Boy Meets World, Maybe This Time and You Wish.

Her film screenplay credits include The Lizzie McGuire Movie and Bratz. She followed with the story for ABC Family film The Cutting Edge: Chasing the Dream.

She is a graduate of Harvard University and USC School of Cinematic Arts.

References

External links

American film producers
American television producers
American women television producers
American television writers
Harvard University alumni
American women screenwriters
American women television writers
Living people
Place of birth missing (living people)
Year of birth missing (living people)
USC School of Cinematic Arts alumni
American women film producers
21st-century American women